What Chilli Wants is an American reality television series that premiered on April 11, 2010, on VH1 starring Chilli, one-third of the Grammy Award-winning R&B trio TLC.  The series chronicles Chilli's quest to find love with the help of Tionna T. Smalls, an author and relationship coach. Not only is she looking for love, but also a husband and hopes to have another baby. The series was renewed for a second season on May 26, 2010.

Episodes

Season 1 (2010)

Season 2 (2011)

References

2010s American reality television series
2010 American television series debuts
2011 American television series endings
English-language television shows
American dating and relationship reality television series
African-American reality television series
VH1 original programming